Franklin Wendell Welker (born March 12, 1946) is an American voice actor. He began his career in the 1960s, and holds over 860 film, television, and video game credits as of 2022, making him one of the most prolific voice actors of all time. With a total worldwide box-office gross of $17.4 billion, he is also the third-highest-grossing actor of all time.

Welker is best known for voicing Fred Jones in the Scooby-Doo franchise since its inception in 1969, and the title protagonist himself since 2002. In 2020, Welker reprised the latter role in the CGI-animated film Scoob!, the only original voice actor from the series in the movie's cast. He has also voiced Oswald the Lucky Rabbit in Epic Mickey and its sequel; Megatron, Galvatron and Soundwave in the Transformers franchise; Shao Kahn and Reptile in the 1995 Mortal Kombat film; Curious George in the Curious George franchise; Garfield on The Garfield Show; Nibbler on Futurama; the titular character in Jabberjaw; Speed Buggy in the Scooby-Doo franchise; Astro and Orbitty on The Jetsons; Mushmouse on Punkin' Puss & Mushmouse; and various characters in The Smurfs as well as numerous animal vocal effects in many works. In 2016, he received a Lifetime Achievement Emmy Award and was nominated for the Children's and Family Emmy Award for Outstanding Voice Performance in an Animated Program in 2022.

Early life and career
Welker was born on March 12, 1946, in Denver, Colorado. His parents were Merrill Welker, a mining engineer, and Lillian.

Voice-acting career
Welker began his career as a stand-up comedian and impressionist in the 1960s, before transitioning to on-screen acting and later voice acting. His first major voice role came in 1969 as Fred Jones in the Scooby-Doo franchise. Welker has voiced Fred in almost every series and incarnation of the Scooby-Doo animated franchise (with the exceptions of A Pup Named Scooby-Doo, Scoob!, and Velma) and has also provided the voice of Scooby-Doo since 2002. As of 2023, Welker is the only original voice actor still in the Scooby-Doo franchise.

His next major character voice was for Wonder Dog (which was inspired by Scooby-Doo) and Marvin White on the 1973 series Super Friends (also produced by Hanna-Barbera). That same year, he played Pudge and Gabby on DePatie-Freleng Enterprises' animated series Bailey's Comets. Welker continued to provide voices for many characters for Hanna-Barbera for several years, which include Jabberjaw, Dynomutt, Dog Wonder, and the Shmoo in The New Fred and Barney Show and its spin-off, The Flintstones Comedy Show. Frank Welker described the voice he used for the Shmoo as "a bubble voice" (one he later used for Gogo Dodo in Tiny Toon Adventures).

In 1978, he played the title character on Fangface and later in its spin-off, Fangface and Fangpuss, and also voiced Heckle and Jeckle and Quacula on The New Adventures of Mighty Mouse and Heckle & Jeckle, and Spike, Tyke, Droopy, Slick Wolf and Barney Bear on The Tom and Jerry Comedy Show.

During the 1980s and 1990s, Welker became a very busy voice actor, providing the voice for many popular cartoon characters in multiple TV series, including Brain, Doctor Claw, and M.A.D. Cat on Inspector Gadget; Mister Mxyzptlk, Darkseid, and Kalibak on Super Friends: The Legendary Super Powers Show; Iceman & various characters on Spider-Man and His Amazing Friends; Wild Bill, Dreadnok Torch, and various G.I. Joe heroes and villains; Scooter on Challenge of the GoBots; Ray Stantz and Slimer in The Real Ghostbusters; the villainous Dr. Jeremiah Surd on The Real Adventures of Jonny Quest; Bubba the Caveduck and two of the Beagle Boys (Bigtime & Baggie) on DuckTales; multiple voices on The Smurfs, including Hefty Smurf, Poet Smurf, and Peewit; and various characters on Captain Planet and the Planeteers.

He also voiced various characters on The Simpsons, such as Santa's Little Helper, Snowball II, and various other animals from 1991 to his departure from the show in 2002.  Welker provided both the speaking voice and animal sounds for Nibbler on Matt Groening's Futurama. He provided the voices for Mr. Plotz, Runt, Ralph the Guard, Buttons, and other characters on Animaniacs, Gogo Dodo, Furball, Beeper, and others on Tiny Toon Adventures, Hector the Bulldog on The Sylvester & Tweety Mysteries, and Tom Cat, Jerry Mouse, and McWolf, the main antagonist to Droopy and his nephew Dripple on Tom and Jerry Kids Show and Droopy, Master Detective.

He also voiced "Gus Goose", "Salty the Seal", "Figaro", "Pegasus" from Hercules, "Abu" the Monkey from Aladdin, "Aracuan Bird" & Cri-Kee from Mulan in the "House of Mouse" from 2001 to 2003.

Welker has also created the vocal effects for many animals and creatures in films, including Abu the monkey, Rajah the tiger, and the Cave of Wonders in Aladdin (1992), its two sequels, the television series, and the remake (2019), Arnold the Pig in the television film Return to Green Acres (1990), the whales in Free Willy 2: The Adventure Home, Shao Kahn and Reptile in the Mortal Kombat movie (1995), the Martians in Tim Burton's Mars Attacks! (1996), and the penguins in Mr. Popper's Penguins (2011). He performed Spock's screams in Star Trek III: The Search for Spock (1984) and voiced The Thing in The Golden Child (1986), Jinx the robot in SpaceCamp (1986), Totoro in the 2005 English version of Studio Ghibli's film My Neighbor Totoro (1988), Alien Sil in Species (1995), Malebolgia in Spawn (1997), and Gargamel's cat Azrael in Sony Pictures Animation's live action/animated film versions of The Smurfs.

In 2006, he began voicing George in the popular children's series Curious George. He also voiced George in the animated film of the same name that same year. In 2007, Welker became the new voice of Garfield, following Bill Murray's departure from the role, and succeeding the original actor Lorenzo Music, who died in 2001 (Welker and Music had previously worked together on The Real Ghostbusters and the original Garfield and Friends). Welker voiced Garfield in Garfield Gets Real (2007), Garfield's Fun Fest (2008), Garfield's Pet Force (2009), and on the series The Garfield Show, which ran from 2008 to 2016. In 2011, he provided the voice of Batman in a Scooby-Doo crossover segment of the Batman: The Brave and the Bold episode, "Bat-Mite Presents: Batman's Strangest Cases!". In the same episode, he also voiced Batboy, the classic Mad Magazine Batman spoof, originally created by Wally Wood.

Welker has also provided voices for many video game characters, most notably Disney's Oswald the Lucky Rabbit and The Shadow Blot in Epic Mickey and its sequel Epic Mickey 2: The Power of Two, as well as Zurvan, also called the Ancient One, on StarCraft II: Heart of the Swarm. He also provided the voice of the mad mage Xzar for the Baldur's Gate video game series, and reprised his role from Avengers Assemble as Odin for Lego Marvel's Avengers.

In 2016, Welker received a Lifetime Achievement Emmy Award at the 43rd Daytime Creative Arts Emmy Awards.

Live-action acting career

Welker's first on-camera film role was as a college kid from Rutgers University who befriends Elvis Presley in The Trouble with Girls (1969). His next film role was in the Disney film The Computer Wore Tennis Shoes (1969), which starred Kurt Russell (he also appeared in the film's sequel, Now You See Him, Now You Don't, in 1972). He later co-starred with Don Knotts in Universal's How to Frame a Figg (1971), appeared in Dirty Little Billy (1972), and on The Paul Lynde Show (1972).

On-camera television appearances included roles on Laugh-In, Love, American Style, The Partridge Family, and The Don Knotts Show. He played a prosecutor in the highly acclaimed ABC special The Trial of General Yamashita and as Captain Pace beside Richard Dreyfuss' Yossarian in Paramount Television's pilot Catch-22. He also appeared on Rowan & Martin's Laugh-In, The Mike Douglas Show, The Tonight Show, The Merv Griffin Show, The Smothers Brothers Show, The Burns and Schreiber Comedy Hour, Laugh Trax, and as one of the cast members in the special of That Was the Year That Was (1985) with David Frost.

Welker also played an on-camera role as a voice actor in a 1984 episode of Simon & Simon. In The Duck Factory, he played a rival actor trying to steal the role of Dippy Duck from fellow voice actor Wally Wooster (Don Messick). In later years, he appeared in Steven Soderbergh's film The Informant! (2009) as Matt Damon's father.

In 1978, Welker appeared on The Dean Martin Celebrity Roast to George Burns. While saluting Burns, he showed his abilities as an impressionist by honoring George Burns with the voices of Walter Cronkite, Henry Kissinger, Muhammad Ali, David Frost, and Jimmy Carter. In 1987, he performed stand-up comedy on an episode of the short lived TV show Keep On Cruisin'''.

Transformers
In the 1980s, Welker voiced many recurring characters in the original Transformers animated series. He voiced several Decepticons, including the leader Megatron, Soundwave, Skywarp, Mixmaster, Rumble, Frenzy, Ravage, and Ratbat, as well as Autobots Mirage, Trailbreaker, and Sludge. He took on the role of Wheelie in The Transformers: The Movie (1986), and in the post-movie episodes took over the role of Galvatron (from his Star Trek III castmate Leonard Nimoy) and also voiced Chromedome and Pinpointer.

In 2010, Welker reprised the roles of Megatron and Soundwave in the series Transformers: Prime (retitled Transformers: Prime – Beast Hunters for its third season) and the Transformers: Generation 1 video game Transformers: Devastation. In Prime, Welker significantly altered Megatron's voice from his Generation 1 portrayal to sound more sinister. In the 2015 follow-up series Transformers: Robots in Disguise, Welker once again reprised his role as Soundwave, who has broken his vow of silence since the events of Prime.

Welker returned to two of his Transformers roles when he portrayed Megatron and Soundwave as part of a spoof in a third-season episode of Robot Chicken, which aired shortly after the release of the first installment of the live-action film series. In the second installment film, Transformers: Revenge of the Fallen (2009), he joined the voice cast and reprised the roles of Soundwave and Ravage, and also provided the voices for Grindor, Devastator, and Reedman. He again reprised his role as Soundwave, and took on the roles of Shockwave and Barricade, in the third film, Transformers: Dark of the Moon (2011). In Transformers: Age of Extinction (2014), he reprised his role as Galvatron, albeit with a voice similar to his portrayal of Megatron in Transformers: Prime.

Welker does not voice Megatron in the first three live-action films (Hugo Weaving was chosen for the role instead). However, he did voice Megatron in the two video games based on the first two films, as well as the theme park attractions at Universal Studios Singapore, Universal Studios Hollywood, and Universal Studios Florida, Transformers: The Ride. In the fifth installment of the film series, Transformers: The Last Knight (2017), he finally reprised the voice of Megatron, once again utilizing his Transformers: Prime version of the character's voice.

As of 2019, Welker continues to occasionally voice Megatron for various Transformers media, alternating between his Generation 1 and his Prime portrayals.

 Personal life 
Welker claims to have dated actress Pamela Sue Martin and his Tom and Jerry Kids and Droopy, Master Detective'' co-star Teresa Ganzel.

Filmography

References

External links

 Frank Welker @ The Numbers
 
 
 
 

1946 births
Living people
20th-century American comedians
20th-century American male actors
21st-century American comedians
21st-century American male actors
American male comedians
Disney people
Pixar people
American male film actors
American male television actors
American male video game actors
American male voice actors
American people of German descent
Animal impersonators
Audiobook narrators
Comedians from Colorado
Daytime Emmy Award winners
Hanna-Barbera people
Male actors from Denver
Santa Monica College alumni